The Campinhos State Park is a state park in the state of Paraná, Brazil.
The environment has been much degraded by human activity and is in the process of regeneration, but there are areas of the original Araucaria Forest.

Location

The Campinhos State Park is divided between the municipalities of Tunas do Paraná and Cerro Azul in the north of the metropolitan region of Curitiba, Paraná.
4.22% is in Tunas of Paraná and 95.78% in Cerro Azul.
It includes the basins of the Pulador and Ermida streams.
The main access to the Park is by Federal Highway BR-476.

It has many limestone caves.
The Gruta dos Jesuítas (Jesuits Cave) is the fifth largest of the state.
Outside the park the Pulador joins the Tigre River to form the Ponta Grossa River, a right tributary of the Ribeira.

History

The Campinhos State Park was created by state decree 31.013 of 20 July 1960.
The main objective was to protect the caves of Conjunto Jesuítas/Fada, one of the most important caving sites of Paraná.
It was expanded by state decree 5.768 of 5 June 2002.
The consultative council was created by IAP decree 010 of 18 February 2003 with representatives of public and private bodies.
The Management Plan was developed by GEEP - Açungui, financed by the National Environment Fund. 
Preparation included workshops with the community to gain consensus on activities and priorities.
It was published in April 2003.

Environment

The Köppen climate classification is Cfb: subtropical humid mesothermal without a defined dry season.

The park was originally covered in mixed montane rainforest, but due to human exploitation little of the original coverage remains.
It is presently in the process of regeneration.
There are fragments of the original Araucaria Forest, which contain species such as Brazilian walnut (Ocotea porosa), Paraná pine (Araucaria angustifolia), yerba mate (Ilex paraguariensis), cedar (Cedrela fissilis) and Brazilian oak (Roupala brasiliensis).
Fauna include crab-eating fox (Cerdocyon thous), brocket deer (Mazama species), Brazilian squirrel (Sciurus aestuans), azure jay (Cyanocorax caeruleus), jacu (Penelope species) and endangered species such as lowland paca (Cuniculus paca) and oncilla (Leopardus tigrinus).

Conflicting activities include hunting, uncontrolled visiting, invasion by exotic species, a road inside the conservation unit and maintenance of a high voltage power transmission line.

Visiting

Visits are mainly by organized groups accompanied by guides for educational purposes.
As of 2017 the park was open from 9:00 to 16:00 from Tuesday to Friday.
Groups of over 15 visitors require prior scheduling.
The responsible person must ensure that the members of the group are aware of the park rules, both for the safety of the visitors and to preserve the environment of the park.
Camping, making fires, hunting and fishing are not allowed.
Visitors must stay on the marked paths and do nothing to damage the environment.

The park has parking, accommodation for volunteers and researchers, garbage bins, a kiosk, benches and picnic tables, toilets and showers.
The visitor center has media projection equipment, a lecture room, restrooms and administration areas.
The visitor center provides environmental education.
The Gruta da Fada is open only to pre-authorized groups for environmental education or research.
There is a  Forest Trail where visitors can learn about the native plant species.

Notes

Sources

State parks of Brazil
Protected areas established in 1960
1960 establishments in Brazil
Protected areas of Paraná (state)